Leptobrycon is a genus of freshwater fish in the family Characidae.  It contains only the single species Leptobrycon jatuaranae, which is  endemic to Brazil, where it occurs in the Amazon River basin. The name Leptobrycon is derived from Greek words leptos (thin) and bryko (to bite)

References
 

Characidae
Monotypic ray-finned fish genera
Characiformes genera
Fish of South America
Fish of Brazil
Endemic fauna of Brazil
Taxa named by Carl H. Eigenmann
Fish described in 1915